Ministry of Interior is the interior ministry of Cyprus. It is headquartered in Nicosia.

See also
 List of Ministers of Interior of Cyprus

References

External links
  Ministry of Interior (Cyprus)
 Ministry of Interior 
Internal affairs ministries
Interior